The Adventure-class ship was a class of eight 44-gun sailing two-decker warships of the Royal Navy, classed as a fifth rate like a frigate, but carrying two complete decks of guns, a lower battery of 18-pounders and an upper battery of 12-pounders. This enabled the vessel to deliver a broadside of 318 pounds. 

The class was designed in 1782 by Edward Hunt, Surveyor of the Navy, as a successor to the Roebuck class design of Sir Thomas Slade.  The design saw a slight increase in breadth over the Roebuck class, but was otherwise very similar. 

Like the Roebuck class, the Adventure class were not counted by the Admiralty as frigates; although sea officers sometimes casually described them and other small two-deckers as frigates, the Admiralty officially never referred to them as such. By 1750, the Admiralty strictly defined frigates as ships of 28 guns or more, carrying all their main battery (24, 26 or even 28 guns) on the upper deck, with no guns or openings on the lower deck (which could thus be at sea level or even lower). A frigate might carry a few smaller guns – 3-pounders or 6-pounders, later 9-pounders – on their quarterdeck and (perhaps) on the forecastle. The Adventure-class ships were two-deckers with complete batteries on both decks, and hence not frigates.

Eight ships were ordered during 1782 and completed to this design, although none were ready to take part in the American War of Independence. Most were not brought into service until the outbreak of the French Revolutionary War, and survived to serve the Royal Navy during the Napoleonic War.

Ships in class 

 Woolwich
 Builder: Thomas Calhoun & John Nowlan, Bursledon
 Ordered: 5 March 1782
 Laid down:  January 1783
 Launched:  15 December 1785
 Completed:  1786 at Portsmouth Dockyard
 Fate:  Wrecked off Barbuda on 11 September 1813.
 Severn
 Builder: James Martin Hillhouse, Bristol
 Ordered: 17 April 1782
 Laid down: June 1783
 Launched: 29 April 1786
 Completed: 17 July 1793 at Plymouth Dockyard
 Fate: Wrecked off Jersey on 21 December 1804
 Sheerness
 Builder: Henry Adams, Bucklers Hard
 Ordered: 26 April 1782
 Laid down: December 1783
 Launched: 16 July 1787
 Completed: 20 December 1787 at Portsmouth Dockyard
 Fate: Wrecked off Trincomalee on 8 January 1805
 Chichester
 Builder: Crookenden, Taylor & Smith, Itchenor
 Ordered: 13 May 1782
 Laid down: August 1782
 Launched: 10 March 1785
 Completed: 28 October 1787 at Portsmouth Dockyard
 Fate: Broken up in July 1815
 Adventure
 Builder: Perry & Hankey, Blackwall Yard
 Ordered: 5 June 1782
 Laid down: October 1782
 Launched: 19 July 1784
 Completed: 28 October 1784 at Woolwich Dockyard
 Fate: Broken up in September 1816
 Expedition
 Builder: John Randall, Rotherhithe
 Ordered: 5 June 1782
 Laid down: October 1783
 Launched: 29 October 1784
 Completed: March 1786 at Deptford Dockyard
 Fate: Broken up in February 1817
 Gorgon
 Builder: Perry & Hankey, Blackwall Yard
 Ordered: 19 June 1782
 Laid down: December 1782
 Launched: 27 January 1785
 Completed: 15 December 1787 at Portsmouth Dockyard
 Fate: Broken up in February 1817
 Dover
 Builder: George Parsons, Bursledon
 Ordered: 8 July 1782
 Laid down: August 1783
 Launched: May 1786
 Completed: 1787 at Portsmouth Dockyard
 Fate: Burnt by accident 20 August 1806

References 

 David Lyon, The Sailing Navy List, Brasseys Publications, London 1993.
 Rif Winfield, British Warships in the Age of Sail, 1714 to 1792: Design, Construction, Careers and Fates, Seaforth Publishing, Barnsley 2007. .

Ship classes